Richard Phelps (born 19 April 1961) is a British former modern pentathlete. He competed at the 1984, 1988, 1992 and the 1996 Summer Olympics. He won a bronze medal in the team event at the 1988 Games.

References

1961 births
Living people
British male modern pentathletes
Olympic modern pentathletes of Great Britain
Modern pentathletes at the 1984 Summer Olympics
Modern pentathletes at the 1988 Summer Olympics
Modern pentathletes at the 1992 Summer Olympics
Modern pentathletes at the 1996 Summer Olympics
Olympic bronze medallists for Great Britain
Olympic medalists in modern pentathlon
Medalists at the 1988 Summer Olympics